Jacob Peters may refer to:

 Jēkabs Peterss or Jacob Peters, Latvian Communist revolutionary
 Jacob Peters (swimmer), British swimmer